Giant's Park is a planned public park, in Belfast, Northern Ireland. The proposed  site is the Dargan Road Landfill site on the northern shore of Belfast Lough 
Its name comes from the nearby Cavehill, which is thought to be the inspiration for Jonathan Swift's Gulliver's Travels. He described the hills as a sleeping giant, safeguarding the city. Planned features of the park include an educational facility and festival space.

See also
List of parks and gardens in Belfast

External links
 Belfast City Council - Giant's Park

References

Parks in Belfast